The ThinkPad T60 is a laptop that was manufactured by Lenovo and marketed under the IBM Brand.

Hardware 
This sub-line includes the basic T60 and associated p series (for performance; e.g., T60p);  While designed and manufactured by Lenovo, the T60 and the T60p still featured the IBM logo on the machines. 

T60 and T60p can be initially ordered with 2 case options (the 14" 4:3 and 15" 4:3 models); the latest lineup includes additional 15" 16:10 model with another motherboard layout (the motherboard of 4:3 models was compatible between 4:3-based cases). 

The T60 is the first T-Series ThinkPad to include the Mobile Intel Core Duo "Yonah" (and later the Intel Core 2 Duo "Merom") technology, and the first T-series ThinkPads to come in widescreen resolution option. This model has a VMX-enabled BIOS, meaning that running fully virtualised operating systems via Xen or VMware is possible, provided a VMX compatible CPU is installed. The 4 GB of DDR2 RAM can be installed, but only 3.25 GB can be visible - this was a chipset hardware limitation.

The keyboard for the T60 was manufactured by Chicony Electronics. The top cover of 14" model was made from magnesium composite (the 15" model has a PBRF plastic top cover), and all T60 ThinkPads has a internal magnesium frame.

Accessories 
All T60 versions supports ThinkPad UltraBay accessories (but SATA connection speed of bay was limited prior to IDE compatibility).

The docking station options includes an Advanced Mini-Dock (with 15 ports, include the DVI-D and RS-232 support) and Advanced Dock with additional PCI-E card support (with up to 1x bus speed).

See also 

 ThinkPad R60 - budget model
 ThinkPad X60 - portable (12") model

References 

IBM laptops
Lenovo laptops
ThinkPad